The coat of arms of Quito is the heraldic symbol that represents this Ecuadorian city and it was granted and issued by the Spanish King Charles I on March 14, 1541. In the Real Cédula (Royal Certificate) the emblazoned is indicated:

The castle is a symbol used by Castile, one of the kingdoms of Charles I and the one that had more weight in the Americas, although it is also commonly used for the representation of a fortress, walled town or city of outstanding importance. The mountains, of which no enamel is specified, draw, when placing the castle in between, a valley, thus representing the geography of the city, located between the Pichincha volcano in the west and other hills, mountains and volcanoes to the east. Each hill shows a cava (cave) that can be related to mining, notable at the beginning of the Spanish presence. The cross is a Christian symbol put over the castle and that is held by its foot by two black eagles. The eagles are heraldic furniture very used by Charles I in representation of his imperial ownership of the Holy Roman Empire and that sometimes is shown as one and two-headed or two eagles in themselves. The Royal Certificate ends by putting by border a cord of St. Francis, saint to which the name of the city was dedicated, in or in a field of azure.

The design used by the Metropolitan City Hall shows the shield accompanied by a molded card decorated and stamped by a golden helmet. This version was adopted on 1944.

References

Quito
Quito